Walk Away Renee is a 2011 American documentary film directed by Jonathan Caouette. It is the third full-length feature in Caouette's filmography.

Summary
Intended as a companion to Caouette's first film, Tarnation, Walk Away Renee documents Caouette's cross-country journey with his mother, Renee Leblanc.  Leblanc, diagnosed with acute bipolar and schizoaffective disorder, is to enter an assisted living facility close to Caouette's home, therefore necessitating a move from Houston to New York City.

Production 
The film was screened as a "work in progress" at the 2011 Festival de Cannes Critics Week.  In July, 2011 distributor Sundance Selects acquired the distribution rights to the film.

Cast 
 Jonathan Caouette, Himself
 Joshua Caouette, Himself
 Zoe Emre Dahan, Young Mother
 Adolph Davis, Himself
 Gavin Octavien, Dr. Ubiddia
 Eva Dorrepaal, Cloudbuster Member
 Renee Leblanc, Herself

References

External links 
 

2011 films
2011 documentary films
American documentary films
Documentary films about mental disorders
Autobiographical documentary films
Films directed by Jonathan Caouette
Films about mother–son relationships
2010s English-language films
2010s American films